Annuloaortic ectasia is a dilation of the proximal ascending aorta and aortic annulus. It may cause aortic regurgitation, thoracic aortic dissection, aneurysm and rupture. It is often associated with connective tissue diseases like Marfan syndrome and Ehlers Danlos Syndrome. It can also be a complication due to tertiary syphilis. In tertiary syphilis the aortic root becomes so dilated that the aortic valve becomes incompetent and cor bovinum results.

The term was first coined by the American heart surgeon Denton Cooley in 1961.

References

Vascular diseases